Jhoel Herrera Zegarra (born July 9, 1980 in Pisco) is a retired Peruvian footballer who played as a right back.

Club career
He has played for GKS Bełchatów in Poland, and Universitario de Deportes and Alianza Lima in Peru. Herrera played for Juan Aurich during the 2011 Torneo Descentralizado season.

In March 2020, Herrera returned to Unión Huaral who was playing in the Peruvian Segunda División. In February 2021, 39-year old Herrera announced his retirement from football.

Honours

Club 
Juan Aurich
 Peruvian First Division (1): 2011

References

External links
 
 
 

1980 births
Living people
People from Pisco, Peru
Peruvian footballers
Peru international footballers
Sporting Cristal footballers
Coronel Bolognesi footballers
Unión Huaral footballers
Club Universitario de Deportes footballers
Club Alianza Lima footballers
GKS Bełchatów players
Cienciano footballers
Total Chalaco footballers
Juan Aurich footballers
Real Garcilaso footballers
Peruvian Primera División players
Ekstraklasa players
Peruvian expatriate footballers
Peruvian expatriate sportspeople in Poland
Expatriate footballers in Poland
2007 Copa América players
Association football fullbacks